In enzymology, a ribulokinase is an enzyme that catalyzes the chemical reaction

ATP + L(or D)-ribulose  ADP + L(or D)-ribulose 5-phosphate

The 3 substrates of this enzyme are ATP, L-ribulose, and D-ribulose, whereas its 3 products are ADP, L-ribulose 5-phosphate, and D-ribulose 5-phosphate.

This enzyme belongs to the family of transferases, specifically those transferring phosphorus-containing groups (phosphotransferases) with an alcohol group as acceptor.  The systematic name of this enzyme class is ATP:L(or D)-ribulose 5-phosphotransferase. Other names in common use include ribulokinase (phosphorylating), and L-ribulokinase.  This enzyme participates in pentose and glucuronate interconversions.

References

 
 
 

EC 2.7.1
Enzymes of unknown structure